Originally, .hack//Sign was broadcast in Japan on TV Tokyo between April 4, 2002 and September 25, 2002. The same year Victor Entertainment released the entire score in three albums, along with a single containing the opening and ending of the series.

In North America .hack//Sign was licensed and distributed by Bandai Entertainment, and dubbed by PCB Productions, who are known for their adaptations of fare like Geneshaft. The dub aired on Cartoon Network's Toonami between February 1, 2003 and March 1, 2004. The series was also released on DVD, spanning six volumes. The limited edition ran from March 4, 2003 to March 16, 2004, followed by the regular edition from March 18, 2003 to March 16, 2004. A recap episode called Evidence and the DVD only episode Intermezzo were included in the sixth volume, and Unison was only included in its limited edition. Following the multimedia concept of the franchise, Bandai also acquired the license for the .hack games, the first one being released the same month the anime series began broadcast.

The multimedia approach is shown through the DVD release as well. The limited edition not only included the three soundtrack albums of the series, but also the soundtrack of .hack//Liminality and a demo disc of the first game.
The series was compiled three times. The first DVD boxset was released on October 26, 2004 by the name .hack//Sign – Complete Collection, and the second, more affordable one on August 22, 2006 by the name .hack//Sign: Anime Legends Complete Collection. Neither of these releases contains the OVA episode "Unison". The third, named .hack//Sign: The Complete Series, was released by Funimation in 2015. This release contains the OVA episode "Unison".

Television episodes

OVA

References

External links
 

Sign Episodes
Hack Sign
Bee Train Production